RuPaul's Drag Race UK is a British reality competition streaming television series based on the American television series of the same name. The television series is produced by World of Wonder for the BBC. The show premiered on the BBC's web streaming service BBC Three on 3 October 2019. The show is distributed internationally on the streaming service WOW Presents Plus. RuPaul's Drag Race UK documents RuPaul in his search for "UK's next drag superstar. RuPaul plays several roles on the show including host, mentor and head judge for the series, as the contestants are given different challenges to participate in each week. The show also employs panel of judges: RuPaul, Michelle Visage, Alan Carr and Graham Norton. In November 2019, RuPaul's Drag Race UK was renewed for a second series.

Series overview

Episodes

Series 1 (2019) 

The first series released from 3 October 2019 to 21 November 2019 in the United Kingdom on the streaming service BBC Three. Internationally the programme was released on WOW Presents Plus. Baga Chipz, Blu Hydrangea, Cheryl Hole, Crystal, Divina de Campo, Gothy Kendoll, Scaredy Kat, Sum Ting Wong, Vinegar Strokes and The Vivienne were revealed as the Queens competing on 21 August 2019. The first series introduces the concept of RuPaul's Drag Race UK where RuPaul searches for the "UK's next drag superstar." RuPaul plays several roles on the show including host, mentor and head judge for the series, as the contestants are given different challenges to participate in each week. The show also employs panel of judges: RuPaul, Michelle Visage, Alan Carr and Graham Norton. Alongside the main judging panel, a celebrity guest judge joins them each week. For the first series, these included Andrew Garfield, Maisie Williams, Twiggy, Geri Halliwell, Jade Thirlwall, Cheryl and Michaela Coel.

The programme features no cash prizes or sponsorships, unlike the original American series, due to the fact the BBC is a publicly funded broadcaster. Instead the winners of the weekly challenge were awarded with a "Ru Peter Badge" which was partly inspired by British children's show Blue Peter that first aired on the BBC. The winner of the competition received an all-expenses paid trip to Hollywood to star in her own digital series produced by World of Wonder. During the finale The Vivienne won the competition and was crowned the "UK's First Drag Superstar".

Series 2 (2021)

The second series of RuPaul's Drag Race UK was confirmed and casting was closed on 15 November 2019. Graham Norton and Alan Carr were confirmed to return as judges alongside RuPaul and Michelle Visage. Carr revealed the second series "had double the applicants" compared to the first series. Filming was suspended in March 2020 due to the COVID-19 pandemic. However, filming for the second series resumed later that year in November 2020. On 16 December 2020, Lawrence Chaney, Cherry Valentine, Tia Kofi, Bimini Bon-Boulash, Ginny Lemon, Ellie Diamond, Sister Sister, Tayce, Joe Black, Veronica Green, Asttina Mandella and A'Whora were all announced as the new queens competing. The guest judges for the second series included Elizabeth Hurley, Sheridan Smith, Jourdan Dunn, Lorraine Kelly, MNEK, Jessie Ware, Maya Jama and Dawn French. During the finale, Lawrence Chaney won the competition and was crowned the "UK's Next Drag Superstar".

Series 3 (2021) 

The third series of RuPaul's Drag Race UK was confirmed and casting was closed in November 2020. The series was filmed in Manchester. The cast was officially announced on 18 August 2021 on social media, consisting of Veronica Green, Kitty Scott-Claus, River Medway, Scarlett Harlett, Vanity Milan, Ella Vaday, Choriza May, Victoria Scone, Elektra Fence, Anubis, Krystal Versace and Charity Kase. Veronica Green was forced to withdraw from the second series after testing positive for COVID-19, however was given an open invitation to return to the competition for the third series by RuPaul. Victoria Scone is the franchise's first ever cisgender female contestant since its beginning in 2009. Graham Norton and Alan Carr returned as judges alongside RuPaul and Michelle Visage. The guest judges for the third series included Matt Lucas, Oti Mabuse, Nicola Coughlan, Emma Bunton, Leigh-Anne Pinnock, Lulu, Alesha Dixon, Russell Tovey and Kathy Burke. During the finale, Krystal Versace won the competition and was crowned the "UK's Next Drag Superstar".

Series 4 (2022) 

The fourth series of RuPaul's Drag Race UK was confirmed on 27 October 2021, and casting was closed on 10 November. The cast was officially announced on 7 September 2022, consisting of Danny Beard, Baby, Pixie Polite, Sminty Drop, Starlet, Jonbers Blonde, Black Peppa, Just May, Dakota Schiffer, Copper Topp, Le Fil and Cheddar Gorgeous. Alan Carr and Graham Norton returned as judges alongside RuPaul and Michelle Visage. The guest judges for the fourth series included Dame Joanna Lumley, FKA Twigs, Leomie Anderson, Alison Hammond, Hannah Waddingham, Mel B, Boy George, Raven, Lorraine Pascale and Olly Alexander. During the finale, Danny Beard won the competition and was crowned the "UK's Next Drag Superstar".

References

External links 
 

UK
Lists of British LGBT-related television series episodes
Lists of British non-fiction television series episodes
Lists of British reality television series episodes